The Ballads (re-released in the UK in 2010 as LoveSongs) is the third compilation album by American singer and songwriter Mariah Carey. The album features some of Carey's top selling ballads over the course of her career. It was released internationally in late 2008, and in North America in January 2010.

Background
The album contains some of Carey's hits and singles, primarily from her time at Columbia Records. It does not feature any new material or include songs recorded with her then-current label, Island Records.

The 1993 single "Hero" was re-recorded and re-released to promote The Ballads compilation. The video shows Mariah Carey walking into the recording room accompanied by her dog, lingering in the studio and singing to the song. It is intercut with a scene of New York City during the night.

Promotion
Carey performed "Hero" at the Inauguration of Barack Obama on January 20, 2009, in Washington, D.C., and was featured on a CBS TV special.

A limited edition of The Ballads was being sold exclusively at all Target Stores; this edition included a small bottle of Carey's fragrance Luscious Pink.

Critical reception

Blogcritics said: "This release is a different type of Mariah Carey album. Without her faster and hip hop songs, it is smoother as it puts the focus squarely on her vocals which has always been her greatest attribute and saving grace." AllMusic said: "And that's what The Ballads is: nothing but big love songs sung in a big voice." Billboard stated that the album "will keep singing on the chart as we get closer to Valentine's Day, as it seems like a natural gift purchase."

Commercial performance
The album debuted at number 17 on UK Albums Chart. Following a successful appearance on X Factor, the album peaked at number 13 in its 4th week and remained on chart for ten consecutive weeks. In Ireland, the album peaked at number 8 and remained on chart for twelve weeks, and has been certified gold. In New Zealand, the album peaked at number 19, remaining on chart for three weeks. The album also debuted at number 79 in Australia. In Japan, the album has reached number 19. The album debuted at number 45 on the Dutch Albums Chart and fell nine spots behind in the second week. In the third week the album climbed from number 54 to 5.

The album debuted at number 10 on the U.S. Billboard 200 with first week sales of 29,000 units. It was the chart's highest debut in that week and the fourth compilation that Carey has charted, following #1's (number 4 in 1998), Greatest Hits (number 52 in 2001) and The Remixes (number 26 in 2003). It also debut at number 7 on the Top R&B/Hip-Hop Albums chart. As of November 2018, the album has sold 395,000 copies in the US.

Track listing

Charts

Weekly charts

Year-end charts

Certifications and sales

Release history
Italy – October 17, 2008
South Korea and Argentina – October 21, 2008
Hong Kong – October 22, 2008
Germany – October 24, 2008; April 10, 2009
Australia – November 3, 2008
France – November 17, 2008
Japan – November 26, 2008
Canada – November 2008
Brazil – December 2, 2008
Taiwan – December 30, 2008
Portugal – January 19, 2009
US – January 20, 2009
Spain – February 3, 2009

LoveSongs
LoveSongs is the third compilation album by Mariah Carey. It is a re-release of The Ballads (without the song "All I Want for Christmas Is You"), and was released exclusively in the UK in time for Valentine's Day on February 8, 2010.

Track listing

References

2008 greatest hits albums
Mariah Carey compilation albums
Albums produced by Jermaine Dupri
Albums produced by Jimmy Jam and Terry Lewis
Albums produced by Walter Afanasieff